1091 Spiraea, provisional designation , is a carbonaceous Cybele asteroid from the outer regions of the asteroid belt, approximately 36 kilometers in diameter. It was discovered on 26 February 1928, by astronomer Karl Reinmuth at the Heidelberg-Königstuhl State Observatory in southwest Germany. The asteroid was named after Spiraea, a genus of plants.

Orbit and classification 

Spiraea orbits the Sun in the outer main-belt at a distance of 3.2–3.6 AU once every 6 years and 4 months (2,318 days). Its orbit has an eccentricity of 0.06 and an inclination of 1° with respect to the ecliptic. With these orbital parameters, it belongs to the Cybele asteroids, a dynamical group near the 4:7 resonance with Jupiter and named after one of the largest asteroids, 65 Cybele. It is, however, a non-family asteroid from the main belt's background population when applying the hierarchical clustering method (Nesvorny, Novakovic, Knezevic and Milani) to its proper orbital elements.

Physical characteristics 

Spiraea  is an assumed carbonaceous C-type asteroid.

Rotation period 

In December 2014, a fragmentary rotational lightcurve of Spiraea was obtained from photometric observations in the R-band by astronomers at the Palomar Transient Factory in California. Lightcurve analysis gave a rotation period of 7.01 hours with a brightness amplitude of 0.03 magnitude.

Diameter and albedo 

According to the surveys carried out by the Japanese Akari satellite and the NEOWISE mission of NASA's Wide-field Infrared Survey Explorer, Spiraea measures between 35.178 and 40.52 kilometers in diameter and its surface has an albedo between 0.05 and 0.091.

The Collaborative Asteroid Lightcurve Link assumes a standard albedo for carbonaceous asteroids of 0.057 and calculates a diameter of 32.78 kilometers based on an absolute magnitude of 11.15.

Naming 

This minor planet was named after Spiraea, a genus of shrubs of the rose family (Rosaceae), with small white or pink flowers. The official naming citation was mentioned in The Names of the Minor Planets by Paul Herget in 1955.

Reinmuth's flowers 

Due to his many discoveries, Karl Reinmuth submitted a large list of 66 newly named asteroids in the early 1930s. This list also contained a sequence of 28 asteroids, starting with 1054 Forsytia, that were all named after plants, in particular flowering plants (also see list of minor planets named after animals and plants).

References

External links 
 Asteroid Lightcurve Database (LCDB), query form (info )
 Dictionary of Minor Planet Names, Google books
 Asteroids and comets rotation curves, CdR – Observatoire de Genève, Raoul Behrend
 Discovery Circumstances: Numbered Minor Planets (1)-(5000) – Minor Planet Center
 
 

001091
Discoveries by Karl Wilhelm Reinmuth
Named minor planets
19280226